The 2014–15 FC Schalke 04 season was the 111th season in the club's football history. In 2014–15 the club plays in the Bundesliga, the top tier of German football. It is the club's 23rd consecutive season in the Bundesliga, having been promoted from the 2. Bundesliga in 1991.

Background

Background information
Schalke 04 finished third in the previous season, meaning that they will automatically qualify for the Group Stage of the UEFA Champions League.

Transfers

Transfers information
The transfer window started very early for Schalke 04 when they announced the signing of 23-year-old goalkeeper Fabian Giefer on a pre-contract from Fortuna Düsseldorf, who currently play in the 2. Bundesliga. This was the first signing of the new season and Giefer joined up with the squad officially on 1 July 2014.

In

Out

Player information

Squad

Friendlies

2014 Schalke 04 Cup

Competitions

Bundesliga

League table

Results summary

Matches

UEFA Champions League

Group stage

Table

Matches

Knockout phase

Round of 16

DFB-Pokal

Team statistics

Squad statistics

Appearances and goals

Players in white left the club during the season.

Discipline

Bookings

Kits

References 

FC Schalke 04 seasons
Schalke
Schalke